The House Across the Street (Spanish:La casa de enfrente) is a 2012 novel by the Spanish writer Esteban Navarro. It was her final work.

History 

The novel is a paradigm of digital publishing, since its author is considered one of the pioneers. In a short time it became one of the best selling ebooks.

References

Bibliography
  Ediciones B. World Literature in Spanish: An Encyclopedia: An Encyclopedia. ABC-CLIO, 20 Oct 2011.

Novels by Esteban Navarro
2012 novels
21st-century Spanish novels